Plates Coutures ("Flat Sewings", defeated) is the fifth studio album by French rock band Matmatah. It was released in France on 3 March 2017. Marrée Haute ("High Tide") is the first extract of the eleven new songs. The album was released after a 9-year absence.

Conception 

The album's recording began in secret as the members began working on the project one year before announcing the group's reformation. A new guitarist joined the band, Emmanuel Baroux, who collaborated with Axel Bauer and Astonvilla.

Matmatah traveled to West Yorkshire, England to begin recording in August 2016. Guitarist Bruno Green (Detroit) was in charge of production. In October, the songs were mixed at ICP studios in Brussels. Mastering took place at Abbey Road Studios in London.

Track listing

Personnel

Design 
 Emmanuel Baroux – guitars, keyboards, vocals
 Éric Digaire – bass, guitars, keyboards, percussions, vocals
 Benoît Fournier – drums, percussion, guitars, piano
 Tristan Nihouarn – guitars, keyboards, harmonica, percussion, flute, vocals
 Bruno Green – keyboards, guitars, percussions

Additional musicians 
 Gaëlle Kerrien – choirs (2, 11)
Gaëlle Bellaunay – choirs (2)
 Morgane Mercier – choirs director (11), choirs (2, 11)
 Ghislaine Bachelier, Odile Guillarmou, Nadia Le Goff, Grand Palladium – choirs (11)
 Dana Colley – bass clarinet, saxophones (baritone, tenor and viola), flute, voice (5)
 Sebastien Blanchon – trumpet (4, 6)
 David Dupuis – trombone (6)
 Jacopo Costa: cimbalum (4, 9)

Charts

References

External links 

 

2017 albums
Matmatah albums